Meta-knowledge or metaknowledge is knowledge about knowledge.

Some authors divide meta-knowledge into orders:
 zero order meta-knowledge is knowledge whose domain is not knowledge (and hence zero order meta-knowledge is not meta-knowledge per se)
 first order meta-knowledge is knowledge whose domain is zero order meta-knowledge
 second order meta-knowledge is knowledge whose domain is first order meta-knowledge
 most generally,  order meta-knowledge is knowledge whose domain is  order meta-knowledge.
Note that other authors call zero order meta-knowledge first order knowledge, and call first order meta-knowledge second order knowledge; meta-knowledge is also known as higher order knowledge.

Meta-knowledge is a fundamental conceptual instrument in such research and scientific domains as, knowledge engineering, knowledge management, and others dealing with study and operations on knowledge, seen as a unified object/entities, abstracted from local conceptualizations and terminologies.
Examples of the first-level individual meta-knowledge are methods of planning, modeling, tagging, learning and every modification of a domain knowledge. 
Indeed, universal meta-knowledge frameworks have to be valid for the organization of meta-levels of individual meta-knowledge.

Meta-Knowledge may be automatically harvested from electronic publication archives, to reveal patterns in research, relationships between researchers and institutions  and to identify contradictory results.

See also 
 Epistemic logic
 Macropædia
 Metacognition
 Metalearning
 Metaprogramming (in computer science)
 Metahistory (concept)
 Metahistory, a book by Hayden White
 Meta-philosophy
 Meta-epistemology
 Metalogic
 Metamathematics
 Metaphysics
 Meta-ethics
 Meta-ontology
 Metatheory
 Metadata

References

External links 

 Knowledge Interchange Format Reference Manual Chapter 7: Metaknowledge, Stanford University
 A Survey of Cognitive and Agent Architectures: Meta-knowledge,  University of Michigan

Knowledge
Metaphilosophy

sv:Metakunskap